Thomas I. Barkin (born 1961) is an American central banker, who became the eighth president and CEO of the Federal Reserve Bank of Richmond on January 1, 2018. He worked at global management consulting firm McKinsey & Company for 30 years in increasingly senior positions, including as global chief financial officer (CFO) and chief risk officer, with oversight of finance, legal and information technology functions, among others. He also served on the executive committee of the Metro Atlanta Chamber of Commerce, Emory University Board of Trustees member, and former board member and chairman of the Federal Reserve Bank of Atlanta.

Education and early career
Barkin was born and raised in Tampa, Florida. He graduated from Harvard University in 1983 with a bachelor's degree in Economics. In 1987, he earned a JD and an MBA in the joint degree program offered by Harvard Law School and Harvard Business School.

Professional career

Barkin worked for global management consulting firm McKinsey for 30 years. From 2009 to 2015, Barkin served as the firm's chief financial officer.

Most recently, Barkin was a senior partner in McKinsey's Atlanta office, where his primary client focus was helping financial institutions and travel and transportation companies.  From 2015 to 2017, he served as the McKinsey's chief risk officer.

Outside boards and organizations
Barkin served on numerous boards for community groups and organizations. While in Atlanta, he served on the executive committee of the Metro Atlanta Chamber of Commerce. He is a member of the Emory University Board of Trustees. He also was a member of the executive board of the United States Golf Association (USGA), and in 2017 on the board's Audit, Finance and Handicap Committees.

Barkin served on  the board of directors for the Federal Reserve Bank of Atlanta from 2009 to 2014, and was the board’s chairman from 2013 to 2014.

Personal life
Barkin and his wife, Robyn Rieser Barkin, have two children.

See also
 Federal Reserve System
 Federal Reserve Bank of Richmond

References

External links
 Federal Reserve biography

1961 births
Living people
People from Tampa, Florida
American chief executives of financial services companies
American chief financial officers
Harvard Law School alumni
Harvard Business School alumni
Federal Reserve Bank of Richmond presidents
Emory University people
Harvard College alumni